"Resistiré" (I Will Resist) is a pop rock song performed by Argentine band Erreway. The song was used as the closing theme for the Cris Morena Group series Rebelde Way. "Resistiré" is considered one of the band's biggest hits.

Song information 
In television series Rebelde Way, "Resistiré" was written by Pablo Bustamante (Benjamín Rojas) and was dedicated to Marizza Spirito (Camila Bordonaba), telling the story of friendship and rebellion. In reality, the song was written by Cris Morena and Carlos Nilson, who wrote most of the songs for Erreway's albums Señales (2002), Tiempo (2003) and Memoria (2004).

Other appearances 
"Resistiré" was often used in the television series Rebelde Way. It was its closing theme during almost whole series. As one of the biggest hits performed by Erreway, the song appeared on every compilation album released by Erreway — Erreway en Concierto (2006), El Disco de Rebelde Way (2006) and Erreway presenta su caja recopilatoria (2007).

Music video 
The music video for "Resistiré" was directed by Rebelde Way and Erreway creator Cris Morena. The video features the band members Felipe Colombo, Benjamín Rojas, Camila Bordonaba and Luisana Lopilato as its protagonists and other Rebelde Way actors as a supporting cast. It follows friends who stay together in both good times and bad times, while they also develop themselves as personalities.

References

External links 
 Official Video at the YouTube
 Erreway at the Last.fm

2002 singles
Erreway songs
Songs written by Cris Morena
Songs written by Carlos Nilson